The lac Long is crossed by the Noire River, entirely in the municipality of Saint-Alban, in the MRC of Portneuf Regional County Municipality, in the administrative region of Capitale-Nationale, in province, Canada.

The area around Long Lake is served on the east side by Joseph-Perthius Road (northeast part) and Lac-Clair West Road (southeast part). Secondary forest roads serve the other parts around the lake. Forestry is the sector's main economic activity; recreational tourism, second.

The surface of Long Lake is usually frozen from the beginning of December to the end of March, however the safe circulation on the ice is generally done from mid-December to mid-March.

Geography 
This lake is located entirely in the forest. This lake has four bays on the southwest shore, one of which receives the discharge (coming from the west) of Lac Nadeau. It also includes two bays on the northeast shore, one of which collects the discharge (coming from the east) of a small unidentified lake and the other receives the discharge of a set of lakes including Lac à Gougeon, Le Gros Lac, Lac Travers, Lac La Salle, Lac Damas, Lac des Îles, Lac Lépine and Lac No name.

Comprising , Portneuf Regional Natural Park includes Long Lakes, Montauban, Carillon, Sept Îles, en Cœur, "À l'Anguille" and some other bodies of water more secondary. This park is popular for recreational and tourist activities: hiking trails, boat launching ramp...

The mouth of Long Lake is located southeast of the lake. Its emissary is the Noire River, which crosses the plain of Saint-Laurent in a serpentine way to the village of Saint-Casimir. From the mouth of Lac Long, the current flows over:
  to the south by the Noire River;
  towards the south by the Sainte-Anne River which flows on the northwest bank of the Saint-Laurent river.

Toponymy 
The name Lac Long appears on the map of the canton of Montauban in 1902. All subsequent cartographic documents reproduce the same spelling, except in one case where this body of water is designated Lac Poline. Quebec toponymy includes more than 200 geographic places officially named (Long or Long) because of their lengthwise extent, whose designations in native languages take the forms of Kinogami, Kachinukamach, Kachinuwayach, Takiyok ... Historically, maps and ancient texts show that the adjective long or long was used in the toponymy of New France. For example, Champlain records the name "isle Longue" in 1604; the Jesuit Relation for 1634 mentions "in Long Sault" on the Outaouais. A 1702 map shows that the Longue Pointe formed by the Island of Montreal facing the Boucherville Islands had already helped to name the Fort de la Longue-Pointe and would subsequently make it possible to identify the parish in 1724 and the municipality in 1845 Today, it is the lakes that are mainly named this way since there have been more than 160 distributed throughout the territory. In addition, several toponyms are officially known by another designation than their original designation Long or Long. For example, the Koroc River in Nord-du-Québec previously bore the name of Rivière Longue. Several Long lakes, replaced, have received surnames such as Chopin Lake, Bouthillier Lake, Bienville Lake, etc. Some have taken other descriptive or common names which sometimes gravitate in the same semantic field as the long word such as Elongé, Effilé, Étroit, Filiforme, etc.

The toponym "Lac Long" was formalized on December 5, 1968, at the Place Names Bank of the Commission de toponymie du Québec.

See also 
 List of lakes of Canada

References 

Lakes of Capitale-Nationale